= Speed limits in Lebanon =

Speed limits in Lebanon, unless otherwise indicated, are:

- 50 km/h (31 mph) in the city
- 70 km/h (43 mph) on rural roads
- 100 km/h (62 mph) on "major highways"

Since November 1, 2010, speed limit enforcement in Lebanon has become more stringent, and the number of tickets issued has dramatically increased.
